Interlude in Prague is a 2017 film about a fictional episode in the life of Wolfgang Amadeus Mozart that led to his writing the opera Don Giovanni.  It stars Aneurin Barnard, James Purefoy, Samantha Barks, Morfydd Clark, Adrian Edmondson and Anna Rust. It was directed by John Stephenson, written by Brian Ashby and the screenplay by Brian Ashby, Helen Clare Cromarty and John Stephenson.

Plot 
In the year 1788, Mozart escapes Vienna for Prague, but his presence unleashes a series of dramatic events set off by a forbidden love affair with young soprano Zuzanna. His passionate response to danger and heartbreak ultimately expressed through his genius mind and the creation of one of his most famous masterpieces. A provocative twist on the Mozart biopic, with lust and murder.

Cast 
 Aneurin Barnard as Wolfgang Amadeus Mozart
 James Purefoy as Baron Saloka
 Samantha Barks as Josefa Duchek, Mozart's friend and host in Prague
 Morfydd Clark as Zuzanna Lubtak
 Adrian Edmondson as Herr Lubtak, Zuzanna's father
 Anna Rust as Hana, Saloka's maid
 Ruby Bentall as Barbarina, Josefa's maid
 Dervla Kirwan as Frau Lubtak, Zuzanna's mother

Awards 
In November 2017, the film won a Golden Angel Award for the Best International Co-Production Film at the Chinese American Film Festival.

See also
Mozart and Prague for a more historical perspective

References

External links 
 
 

2017 films
Films about Wolfgang Amadeus Mozart
Czech historical films
British historical films
Films set in Vienna
Films set in 1788
Films shot in the Czech Republic
2010s historical films
2010s English-language films
Films directed by John Stephenson (director)
2010s British films